Steven Bell (born 24 February 1985) is a Scottish former professional footballer. Bell started his career with Dundee United, before moving on to play for Queen of the South, Stirling Albion, Dunfermline Athletic, Stranraer, Ayr United, Partick Thistle and Kelty Hearts.

Career

Early career
Bell started his professional career with Dundee United, signing professional forms in 2002. Although Bell featured in matchday squads, he failed to make a first-team appearance during his time at Tannadice, making his first-team debut in a July 2004 friendly at Bolton Wanderers and joined Queen of the South in January 2005. He was injured for much of the 2004–05 season, and before the start of the 2005–06 season he signed for Stirling Albion.

Dunfermline Athletic
On 30 January 2008, Bell signed a pre-contract agreement with Dunfermline Athletic. Bell's move to Dunfermline was expected to be finalised in May 2008 after his contract with Stirling finished. He signed for the Fife side on 19 May 2008. Bell's 88th-minute substitute appearance at Tannadice in October 2008 during Dunfermline's League Cup defeat was his first senior appearance at the ground he spent three years at professionally.

Stranraer
On 31 October 2013, after nearly three years out of football due to injury, Bell signed for Stranraer on a contract until January 2014, having played three matches for the club as a trialist. In January 2014, he signed a new deal until the end of the 2013–14 season. After Frank McKeown left Stair Park for Morton, Bell was appointed Stranraer club captain for the 2015–16 season. After over four years with the side, Bell left Stranraer after the club announced it was suffering from financial difficulties.

Ayr United
On 5 January 2018, he signed for fellow Scottish League One club Ayr United until the end of the 2018–19 season. Bell left Ayr in October 2020, saying that he felt unable to combine his work outside football with training full-time.

East Kilbride
Bell signed for Lowland League club East Kilbride on 7 October 2020.

Partick Thistle
In March 2021, Bell joined Scottish League One club Partick Thistle on loan until the end of the season. He made ten league appearances as Thistle won the 2020–21 League One title.

After spending the second half of the 2020–21 season with Thistle and winning the Scottish League One title, Bell joined the club on a permanent basis in June 2021, signing a one year deal with the Jags.

Kelty Hearts
Bell signed for League One club Kelty Hearts in August 2022.

On 24th September 2022, Bell announced his retirement from football

Career statistics

Honours

Club
Ayr United 
 Scottish League One: 2017–18

Partick Thistle
Scottish League One: 2020–21

References

External links
  (2003–2008)
  (2007–)

1985 births
Living people
Dundee United F.C. players
Queen of the South F.C. players
Stirling Albion F.C. players
Dunfermline Athletic F.C. players
Stranraer F.C. players
Ayr United F.C. players
Scottish Football League players
Association football utility players
Scottish footballers
Scottish Professional Football League players
Association football midfielders
Partick Thistle F.C. players
East Kilbride F.C. players
Lowland Football League players
Kelty Hearts F.C. players